Corkin Hill is a summit located in Central New York Region of New York located in the Towns of Annsville and Florence in Oneida County, northwest of Taberg.

References

Mountains of Oneida County, New York
Mountains of New York (state)